Fernando Ariel Batista (born 20 August 1970) is Argentine football manager and retired player who is currently the head coach of the Venezuela national team.

Playing career

Batista started his playing career with Argentine top flight side Argentinos Juniors, where he made 134 league appearances and scored 4 goals. In 1997, Batista signed for Godoy Cruz in the Argentine second division.

International career

He represented Argentina U20 at the 1989 FIFA World Youth Championship.

Managerial career

In 2018, Batista was appointed manager of Armenia U19. After that, he was appointed manager of Argentina U20.  In 2019, he was appointed manager of Argentina U23.

On March 2023, Batista was announced the new appointed manager for the Venezuela national team, after the departure of José Pékerman.

Managerial Statistics

 Official FIFA matches only.

References

External links
 Fernando Batista at playmakerstats.com
 

Association football midfielders
Argentine footballers
Association football defenders
Argentine football managers
Expatriate footballers in Japan
Expatriate football managers in Armenia
Living people
1970 births
Argentinos Juniors footballers
San Lorenzo de Almagro footballers
Godoy Cruz Antonio Tomba footballers
All Boys footballers
Footballers from Buenos Aires
Argentina national under-20 football team managers